Bishop Pietro Filippi (died 8 September 1640) was a Roman Catholic prelate who served as Bishop of Boiano (1633–1640).

Biography
On 26 September 1633, he was appointed by Pope Urban VIII as Bishop of Boiano. On 2 October 1633, he was consecrated bishop by Giovanni Battista Pamphili, Cardinal-Priest of Sant’Eusebio, with Luca Cellesi, Bishop of Martirano, and Antonio Brunachio, Bishop of Conversano as co-consecrators. He served as Bishop of Boiano until his death on 8 September 1640.

References

External links
 (for Chronology of Bishops) 
 (for Chronology of Bishops) 

1640 deaths
17th-century Italian Roman Catholic bishops
Bishops appointed by Pope Urban VIII